The Sony Cyber-shot DSC-F828 is a 8.0 megapixel digital bridge camera announced by Sony on August 15, 2003.

Overview
As successor of the DSC-F717, F828 was widely considered "revolutionary" at launch. Major changes / improvements over its predecessor, the 2002 F717 include:

 "Carl Zeiss T*" lens with 7x (28-200mm) zoom range, wider compared to F717's 5x (38-190mm)
 Mechanically-linked zoom ring
 8.0 megapixel, 2/3 inch, 4-color RGBE CCDs, highest pixel counts in any consumer camera sensors at launch.
 Upgraded electronics for faster focus and post-processing. Continuous AF, and VGA-quality (640x480) filming were made possible.
 Addition of a CompactFlash slot as an alternative to Sony's proprietary Memory Sticks. Although, a Memory Stick Pro is required for VGA-quality filming.
 Shutter speed up to 1/3200s

The F828, along with the "Cyber-shot F" series designation, was discontinued in 2005.

Reception
Despite having attractive on-paper specs, F828 did not fare as well as its predecessor among camera reviewers and photographers. F828 received a "Recommended / Above average" rating from DPReview, in contrast to a "Highly recommended" given to F717.

Visible picture noise, associated with increased pixel density and underdeveloped noise reduction algorithm, was of primary concern. Moreover, the novel RGBE sensor did not bring in much improved color accuracy as expected; this led Sony to drop any further development on such sensors, making F828 the first and the last commercial camera ever to use a 4-color sensor. Many photographers also noted more severe purple fringing on F828s than on its predecessors.

References

http://www.dpreview.com/products/sony/compacts/sony_dscf828/specifications

F828
Sony Cyber-shot DSC-F828